Civil War Institute may refer to:

 Civil War Institute at Gettysburg College
 Civil War Institute at Manor College
 Bridgewater College Civil War Institute